Dinosaur mummy may refer to:

Edmontosaurus mummy AMNH 5060
Edmontosaurus mummy SMF R 4036
Dakota (fossil), Edmontosaurus mummy NDGS 2000
"Ciro", the holotype of Scipionyx samniticus
The "Suncor nodosaur", the holotype of Borealopelta markmitchelli